Saskia Weishaupt (born 20 September 1993) is a German politician for The Greens and since 2021 member of the Bundestag, the federal diet.

Life and politics 
Weishaupt was born 1994 in the German city of Hanover and studied politics.

Weishaupt was elected to the Bundestag in 2021.

Controversy 
In a tweet on 22 December 2021, Weishaupt called on the police to use pepper spray and batons against a "Querdenker" demonstration in Munich. The demonstration had been cancelled by the organisers. Nevertheless, up to 5,000 participants gathered. Eleven arrests were made. In response to Weishaupt's tweet, the hashtag #SchlagstockSaskia trended on Twitter, with predominantly right-wing criticism from AfD member of parliament Jürgen Braun, among others. Police unionist Manuel Ostermann from Münsterland also criticised Green politician Weishaupt's tweet: "I dread to see you take responsibility. Arm yourself rhetorically. It's obviously about time." Weishaupt deleted her tweet and apologised, saying she "unfortunately had not been able to present the context in the tweet."

References 

Living people
People from Hanover
1993 births
21st-century German politicians
Members of the Bundestag 2021–2025